Allan Kateregga (born 3 June 1994) is a Ugandan professional footballer who plays as an attacking midfielder for FC Saint-Éloi Lupopo in the Democratic Republic of Congo. Besides Uganda, he has played in Kenya, South Africa, and Iraq.

Career
In July 2019, upon his return from loan at Maritzburg United, Kateregga agreed the termination of his contract with Cape Town City.

Career statistics

References

External links

Allan Kateregga at Footballdatabase

1994 births
Living people
Ugandan footballers
Ugandan expatriate footballers
Uganda international footballers
Association football midfielders
2019 Africa Cup of Nations players
South African Premier Division players
SC Victoria University players
A.F.C. Leopards players
Tusker F.C. players
Kampala Capital City Authority FC players
Cape Town City F.C. (2016) players
Maritzburg United F.C. players
Erbil SC players
FC Saint-Éloi Lupopo players
Ugandan expatriate sportspeople in Kenya
Ugandan expatriate sportspeople in South Africa
Ugandan expatriate sportspeople in Iraq
Expatriate footballers in Kenya
Expatriate soccer players in South Africa
Expatriate footballers in Iraq